The 1963 FIBA World Championship was the 4th FIBA World Championship, the international basketball world championship for men's teams. The competition was hosted by Brazil.

The Philippines was originally supposed to host the tournament but FIBA revoked hosting rights after the country refused to grant visas to players from communist countries. Brazil being the defending Champion and a previous host, fairly managed to re-host the Championship from 12 to 25 May 1963 and won the 1st back to back title with just six (6) games by seeding the well-rested host team in the final round only.

Background
The Philippines was supposed to host the FIBA World Championship in 1962 but FIBA revoked hosting rights after the government of then President Diosdado Macapagal, refused to grant visas to players and officials of socialists countries including Yugoslavia and the Soviet Union.

The FIBA World Championship was held in 1963 in Brazil.

Competing nations

Suspension
 FIBA suspended the original host country Philippines after Philippine President Diosdado Macapagal refused to allow players from Yugoslavia and other communist countries to enter the host country. Brazil being the defending Champion and a previous host, fairly managed to re-host the Championship. Later, the Philippines, despite being the Asian champion, was forced to play in a pre-Olympic tournament in order to qualify in the 1964 Summer Olympics.

Competition format
 Preliminary round: Three groups of four teams play each other once; top two teams progress to the final round, bottom two teams relegated to classification round.
 Classification round: All bottom two teams from preliminary round group play each other once. The team with the best record is ranked eighth; the worst is ranked 13th.
 Final round: All top two teams from preliminary round group, the 1960 Olympic champion, and the host team play each other once. The team with the best record wins the championship.

Preliminary round

Group A

Group B

Group C

Classification round

Final round

Awards

Final rankings

All-Tournament Team

 Amaury Pasos (Brazil)
 Wlamir Marques - (MVP) (Brazil)
 Aleksander Petrov (USSR)
 Don Kojis (USA)
 Maxime Dorigo (France)

Top scorers (ppg)
 Ricardo Duarte (Peru) 23.1
 Aleksander Petrov (USSR) 17.6
 Luis Enrique Grajeda (Mexico) 17.5
 Radivoj Korać (Yugoslavia) 16.8
 Maxime Dorigo (France) 16.8
 Alfredo Tulli (Argentina) 16.1
 Alberto Desimone (Argentina) 16
 Rafael Valle (Puerto Rico) 15.8
 Nemanja Djuric (Yugoslavia) 14.6
 Paolo Vittori (Italy) 14.3

References

External links
 
 
 FIBA WC-1963

FIBA Basketball World Cup
International basketball competitions hosted by Brazil
World Championship
1963 FIBA World Championship
 0512-0525
 12-25